Bathyraja leucomelanos, commonly known as domino skate, is a species of softnose skate, closely related to Bathyraja spinicauda. The complete range is not known, however the holotype specimen of B. leucomelanos was caught on the Coriolis Bank, off western New Caledonia in 2002. Dorsal coloration is mostly white, with black on the disc and tail margins. Ventral coloration is black.

The tail has 18 laterally compressed spines, the dorsal surface is covered in denticles, while the ventral surface lacks denticles.

References 

Bathyraja
Taxa named by Samuel Paco Iglésias 
Fish described in 2012